The Chairman of the Smolensk Oblast Duma is the presiding officer of that legislature.

Chairmen

Sources 
Smolensk Oblast Duma

Lists of legislative speakers in Russia
Politics of Smolensk Oblast